Pangalliformes is the scientific name of a provisional clade of birds within the group Galloanserae. It is defined as all birds more closely related to chickens than to ducks, and includes all modern chickens, turkeys, pheasants, and megapodes, as well as extinct species that do not fall within the crown group Galliformes.

A few fragmentary fossils have been described as pangalliforms from the Late Cretaceous (85 million years ago), most notably those of Austinornis lentus. Formerly referred to as Ichthyornis lentus, Graculavus lentus, or Pedioecetes lentus, its partial left tarsometatarsus was found in the Late Cretaceous Austin Chalk near Fort McKinney, Texas. This bird was quite certainly closely related to Galliformes, but whether it was a part of these or belongs elsewhere in the little-known galliform branch of Galloanserae is not clear. In 2004, Clarke classified it within Pangalliformes rather than true Galliformes, pending further fossil finds. Another specimen, PVPH 237, from the Late Cretaceous Portezuelo Formation (Turonian-Coniacian, about 90 Ma) in the Sierra de Portezuelo (Argentina) has also been suggested to be an early relative of true galliformes. This is a partial coracoid of a neornithine bird, which in its general shape and particularly the wide and deep attachment for the muscle joining the coracoid and the humerus bone resembles the more basal lineages of galliforms.

Additional galliform-like pangalliformes are represented by extinct families from the Paleogene, namely the Gallinuloididae, Paraortygidae and Quercymegapodiidae. In the early Cenozoic,  some additional birds  may or may not be early Galliformes, though even if they are, it is rather unlikely that these belong to extant families:
 †Argillipes (London Clay Early Eocene of England)
 †Coturnipes (Early Eocene of England, and Virginia, USA?)
 †Paleophasianus (Willwood Early Eocene of Bighorn County, USA)
 †Percolinus (London Clay Early Eocene of England)
 †"Palaeorallus" alienus (middle Oligocene of Tatal-Gol, Mongolia)
 †Anisolornis (Santa Cruz Middle Miocene of Karaihen, Argentina)

More recently, it has been discovered that Sylviornis and its sister taxa, Megavitiornis, lay outside the Galliformes crown group. This same study also presents Dromornithidae as possibly closer to Galliformes than to Anseriformes as traditionally expected, though it acknowledges more work to be needed in this field.

References

Further reading
 Agnolin, Federico L.; Novas, Fernando E. & Lio, Gabriel (2006): Neornithine bird coracoid from the Upper Cretaceous of Patagonia. Ameghiniana 43(1): 245–248. HTML fulltext
 Clarke, Julia A. (2004): Morphology, Phylogenetic Taxonomy, and Systematics of Ichthyornis and Apatornis (Avialae: Ornithurae). Bulletin of the American Museum of Natural History 286: 1–179 PDF fulltext

Galloanserae
Galliformes
Extant Late Cretaceous first appearances